Lyria beauii is a species of sea snail, a marine gastropod mollusk in the family Volutidae, the volutes.

Description
The length of the shell attains 70 mm.

Distribution
This marine species occurs off Guadeloupe

References

External links
 Fischer P. & Bernardi A.C. (1857). Descriptions d'espèces nouvelles. Journal de Conchyliologie. 5(3): 292-300, pls 8-9

Volutidae
Gastropods described in 1857